Kipkorir sometimes shortened as "P'korir" when speaking; is a given name given to a person(male) born at dawn. It is of Kenyan origin. Son of "Kipkorir" would then be named Arap Korir  meaning "son of Kipkorir"

Politicians
Kigen Luka Kipkorir, Kenyan politician and National Assembly member for the Orange Democratic Movement
Robert Kiptoo Kipkorir, Kenyan politician and former National Assembly member
William Kipkorir, Kenyan politician and National Assembly member for the Orange Democratic Movement
Oliver Kipkorir Bett, Kenyan renowned Teacher from Bureti Litein-Tebesonik

Runners
Bisluke Kiplagat Kipkorir (born 1988), Kenyan steeplechase runner
Daniel Kipkorir Chepyegon (born 1986), Ugandan marathon runner
David Chelule Kipkorir (born 1977), Kenyan long-distance track runner
Jonathan Kosgei Kipkorir (born 1982), Kenyan marathon runner and two-time Venice Marathon winner
Mbarak Kipkorir Hussein (born 1965), Kenyan marathon runner competing for the United States
Michael Kipkorir Kipyego (born 1983), Kenyan marathon runner and former steeplechase specialist
Nicholas Chelimo Kipkorir (born 1983), Kenyan marathon runner and two-time Honolulu Marathon winner
Robert Kipkorir Kipchumba (born 1984), Kenyan road running athlete
Stephen Kipkorir (1970–2008), Kenyan middle-distance runner and Olympics medallist in the 1500 metres

See also
Jepkorir, related surname meaning "daughter of Korir"

Kalenjin names